ABC News is the news division of the American broadcast network ABC. Its flagship program is the daily evening newscast ABC World News Tonight with David Muir; other programs include morning news-talk show Good Morning America, Nightline, Primetime, and 20/20, and Sunday morning political affairs program This Week with George Stephanopoulos.

In addition to the division's television programs, ABC News has radio and digital outlets, including ABC News Radio and ABC News Live, plus various podcasts hosted by ABC News personalities.

History

Early years
ABC began in 1943 as the NBC Blue Network, a radio network that was spun off from NBC, as ordered by the Federal Communications Commission (FCC) in 1942. The reason for the order was to expand competition in radio broadcasting in the United States, specifically news and political broadcasting, and broaden the projected points of view. The radio market was dominated by only a few companies, such as NBC and CBS. NBC conducted the split voluntarily in case its appeal of the ruling was denied and it was forced to split its two networks into separate companies.

Regular television news broadcasts on ABC began soon after the network signed on its initial owned-and-operated television station (WJZ-TV, now WABC-TV) and production center in New York City in August 1948. Broadcasts continued as the ABC network expanded nationwide. Until the early 1970s, ABC News programs and ABC in general consistently ranked third in viewership behind CBS and NBC news programs. ABC had fewer affiliate stations and a weaker prime-time programming slate to be able to support the network's news operations compared to the two larger networks, each of which had established their radio news operations during the 1930s.

Roone Arledge
By the 1970s, the network had effectively turned around, with its prime-time entertainment programs achieving stronger ratings and drawing in higher advertising revenue and profits to ABC overall. With the appointment of then president of ABC Sports, Roone Arledge as president of ABC News in 1977, ABC invested the resources to make it a major source of news content. Arledge, known for experimenting with the broadcast "model", created many of ABC News' most popular and enduring programs, including 20/20, World News Tonight, This Week, Nightline, and Primetime Live. ABC News' longtime slogan, "More Americans get their news from ABC News than from any other source." (introduced in the late 1980s), was a claim referring to the number of people who watch, listen to and read ABC News content on television, radio and (eventually) the Internet, and not necessarily to the telecasts alone.

In June 1998, ABC News (which owned an 80% stake in the service), Nine Network and ITN sold their respective interests in Worldwide Television News to the Associated Press. Additionally, ABC News signed a multi-year content deal with AP for its affiliate video service, Associated Press Television News (APTV), while providing material from ABC's own news video service, ABC News One, to APTV.

20/20 scandal
Scandal erupted in 1985 over a decision by Arledge, president of ABC News and Sports, to kill a 13-minute report about Marilyn Monroe possibly due to his close ties to Ethel Kennedy. 20/20 drew criticism from the co-anchors of the program, Hugh Downs and Barbara Walters, and the executive producer, Av Westin. Arledge said that he had killed the piece because it was "gossip-column stuff" and "does not live up to its billing." Downs, however, took issue with Arledge's judgment. "I am upset about the way it was handled," he said in an interview. "I honestly believe that this is more carefully documented than anything any network did during Watergate. I lament the fact that the decision reflects badly on people I respect and it reflects badly on me and the broadcast."  Additionally, Westin said: "I don't anticipate not putting it on the air. The journalism is solid. Everything in there has two sources. We are documenting that there was a relationship between Bobby and Marilyn and Jack and Marilyn. A variety of eyewitnesses attest to that on camera." Two other aspects of the unaired report, according to an ABC staff member who has seen it, are eyewitness accounts of wiretapping of Monroe's home by Jimmy Hoffa, the teamster leader, that reveal meetings between her and the Kennedy brothers, and accounts of a visit to Monroe by Robert F. Kennedy on the day of her death. Fred Otash, a detective who said he was the chief wiretapper, is interviewed on camera, and ABC staff members said his account was corroborated by three other wiretappers. In addition, several people not in the book say on camera that Monroe kept diaries with references to meetings with the Kennedy brothers, according to a staff member who has seen the report. "It set out to be a piece which would demonstrate that because of alleged relations between Robert Kennedy and John F. Kennedy and Monroe the presidency was compromised because organized crime was involved," he said. "Based on what has been uncovered so far, there was no evidence."  Arledge's decision to kill the broadcast resulted in the subsequent decision of Geraldo Rivera to leave ABC entirely. Rivera was a 20/20 correspondent but did not work on that story. He had been publicly critical of Arledge's decision. Arledge, who was both a champion and defender of Rivera, said he thought the story needed more work. The story probed purported affairs between actress Marilyn Monroe and President John F. Kennedy and his brother Robert F. Kennedy.

Modern era
On August 7, 2014, ABC announced that it would relaunch its radio network division, ABC Radio, on January 1, 2015. The change occurred following the announcement that Cumulus would replace its ABC News radio service with Westwood One News (via CNN). On September 20, 2019, ABC Radio was renamed as ABC Audio as the network has evolved to offer a podcast portfolio and other forms of on-demand and linear content.

In April 2018, it was announced that FiveThirtyEight would be transferred to ABC News from ESPN, Inc., majority owned by The Walt Disney Company. On September 10, 2018, ABC News launched a second attempt to extend its Good Morning America brand into the afternoon with Strahan, Sara and Keke. In May 2019, ABC News Live, an news focused steaming channel, was launched on Roku. Following a reorganization of ABC's parent company, The Walt Disney Company which created the Walt Disney Direct-to-Consumer and International segment in March 2018, ABC News Digital and Live Streaming, including ABC News Live and FiveThirtyEight, were transferred to the new segment.

In an October 2018 Simmons Research survey of 38 news organizations, ABC News was ranked the second most trusted news organization by Americans, behind The Wall Street Journal.

Programming

Current ABC News programs
 ABC World News Tonight (1978–present)
 20/20 (1978–present)
 America This Morning (1982–present)
 Good Morning America (1975–present)
 Good Morning America Weekend (1993–present)
 GMA3: What You Need To Know (2018–present)
 Nightline (1980–present)
 Tamron Hall (2019–present)
 The View (1997–present)
 This Week (1981–present)
 World News Now (1992–present)

Former ABC News programs

Newscast programs
 After the Deadlines (1951–1952)
 Issues and Answers (1969–1981)
 ABC News Weekend Report (1970s—1991)
 AM America (1975)
 Business World (1987-1990)
 Good Afternoon America (2012)
 World News This Morning (1982-2006)
 Turning Point (1994–1999)

Newsmagazines
 Open Hearing (1957–1958)
 Our World (1986–1987)
 20/20 Downtown (1999–2001)
 Closeup
 Day One (1993–1995)
 Our World (1986–1987)
 Primetime (1989–2012)
 Primetime Thursday (2000–2002)
 Turning Point (1994–1999)
 I-Caught (2007)

Public affairs
 College News Conference (1952–1960)
 Answers for Americans (1953–1954)
 Issues and Answers (1960–1981)

Digital programs
 The Debrief (2018–2019)
 The Briefing Room (2018–2019)
 10% Happier (video broadcast of 10% Happier podcast) (2015–2017)
 Real Biz with Rebecca Jarvis (2014–2017)

Other programs
 Discovery (1962–1963)
 Make a Wish (1971–1976)
 Animals, Animals, Animals (1976–1981)
 Biography (1987–2005)
 Peter Jennings Reporting (1990–2005)
 Intimate Portrait (1994–2005) (co-production with Gay Rosenthal Productions)
 The Century: America's Time (1999)
 ABC 2000 Today (1999–2000)
 Medical Mysteries (2006–2008)
 NASCAR in Primetime (2007)
 What Would You Do? (formerly Primetime: What Would You Do?) (2008–2020)
 Popcorn with Peter Traves (2009–present)
 The Generic Detective (2020)
 The Con (2020–present) (co-production with The Intellectual Property Corporation)
 Wild Crimes (2021)
 City of Angels | City of Death (2021) (co-production with Highway 41 Productions)
 Let the World See (2022)
 Have You Seen This Man? (2022)
 Keeper of the Ashes: The Oklahoma Girl Scout Murders (2022)
 Mormon No More (2022)
 The Murders Before the Marathon (2022) (co-production with Anonymous Content and Story Syndicate)
 Where Is Private Dulaney? (2022–present) (co-production with Show of Force and Versus Pictures)
 Death in the Dorms (2023)
 Web of Death (2023)

Other services

ABC News Radio

ABC News Radio is the radio service of ABC Audio, a division of the ABC News. Formerly known as ABC Radio News, ABC News Radio feeds through Skyview Networks with newscasts on the hour to its affiliates. ABC News Radio is the largest commercial radio news organization in the US.

ABCNews.com
ABCNews.com launched on May 15, 1997, by ABC News Internet Ventures, a joint venture between Starwave and ABC formed in April 1997. Starwave had owned and operated ESPNet SportsZone (later known as ESPN.com) since 1995, which licensed the ESPN brand and video clips from ABC's corporate sister ESPN Inc. Disney wanted more control of their Internet properties, which meant ABCNews.com was operated as a joint venture with ABC News having editorial control. Disney had also bought a minority stake in Starwave before the launch of ABCNews.com and would later buy the company outright.

The website initially had a dedicated staff of about 30. In addition to articles, it featured short video clips and audio from the start, delivered using RealAudio and RealVideo technology. Some content was also available via America Online. In 2011, ABC News and Yahoo News announced a strategic partnership to share ABC's online reporting on Yahoo's website; the deal expanded in 2015 to include the Disney/ABC Television Group.

In 2018, ABC News, and Good Morning America specifically, ended the hosting partnership with Yahoo, instead opting to continue separate web presences.

ABC News Live

ABC News Live is a 24/7 streaming video news channel for breaking news, live events, newscasts and longer-form reports and documentaries operated by ABC News since 2018, The channel is available through Roku, Hulu, YouTube TV, Sling TV, Pluto TV, Xumo, FuboTV and the news division's other streaming platforms. The service is under the direction of Colby Smith, senior vice president and general manager of ABC News Digital and Live Streaming and Justin Dial as senior executive producer of ABC News Live.

This unit is producing:
ABC News Live Prime, two weekday one-hour evening newscasts (February 2020-)
GMA3: What You Need To Know, a weekday, hour-long daytime news program on ABC. It premiered in March 2020 as Pandemic: What You Need To Know, as a temporary replacement for its talk show Strahan, Sara and Keke to cover the onset of the Coronavirus pandemic in the United States. It has since replaced it indefinitely. The program is anchored by Amy Robach, joined by ABC News chief medical correspondent Dr. Jennifer Ashton.

Former

Satellite News Channel

Satellite News Channel was a joint venture between ABC News and Group W that launched on June 21, 1982, as a satellite-delivered cable television network. SNC used footage from ABC News and seven Washington, D.C.-based crews, in addition to stories from other overseas networks to provide a rotating newscast every 20 minutes. However, this channel had difficulty getting clearance from cable systems, so ABC News and Group W decided to sell it to its competitor, CNN (a subsidiary of Time Warner's Turner Broadcasting System). CNN ceased Satellite News Channel's operations on October 27, 1983. SNC was either replaced by CNN or CNN2 on most cable systems.

ABC News Now
ABC News Now was a 24-hour cable news network that launched on July 26, 2004, as a digital subchannel by ABC News, being the company's second attempt in the 24-hour cable news world after Satellite News Channel. It was offered via digital television, broadband and streaming video at ABCNews.com and on mobile phones. It delivered breaking news, headline news each half hour, and wide range of entertainment and lifestyle programming. The channel was available in the United States and Europe. Its Talk Back feature allowed viewers to voice their own input through the submission of videos and personal thoughts on controversial issues and current topics. It was shut down as a digital subchannel when after its experimental phase had ended with the President inauguration in 2005. ABC News Now was replaced on cable providers with Fusion on October 28, 2013.

Fusion

Fusion was a digital cable and satellite network owned and operated by Fusion Media Group, LLC, which was a joint venture between ABC News and Univision Communications. ABC and Univision formally announced its launch on May 2, 2012. Launched on October 28, 2013, Fusion features a mix of traditional news and investigative programs along with satirical content aimed at English-speaking Hispanic and Latino American adults between the ages of 18 and 34. The network replaced ABC News Now, a mainly streaming service of ABC News content. In December 2015, it was reported that Disney was in talks to sell its stake in Fusion to Univision. The split was complete on April 21, 2016; Univision alone would continue to operate Fusion until December 31, 2021, when it shut down the network.

Personnel

Current television anchors, correspondents, and reporters
New York (Main​ Headquarters)

 Mona Kosar Abdi – Correspondent (2019–present)
 Dan Abrams – Chief Legal Analyst (2011–present)
 Rhiannon Ally – Co-Anchor, World News Now and America This Morning; Correspondent (2022–present)
 Dr. Jennifer Ashton – Chief Health & Medical Editor; Chief Medical Correspondent (2012–present)
Trevor Ault – Correspondent
 Jim Avila – Senior National Correspondent (2000–present)
 Joy Behar – Co-Host, The View (1997–2013, 2015–present)
 Gio Benitez – Transportation Correspondent (2013–present)
 Deirdre Bolton - Business Correspondent
 Juju Chang – Co-Anchor, Nightline (1996–present)
 Chris Connelly – Contributor, Good Morning America and 20/20 (2001–present)
 Linsey Davis  – Anchor, ABC News Live Prime; Anchor, World News Tonight Sunday (2007–present)
 Andrew Dymburt – Co-Anchor, World News Now and America This Morning; Correspondent (2020–present)
 Andrea Fujii – Part-Time Correspondent, World News Now
 Whoopi Goldberg – Co-Host, The View (2007–present)
 Will Ganss – Entertainment/ Lifestyle Reporter
 Sara Haines – Co-Host, The View; Correspondent (2013–present)
 Sunny Hostin – Senior Legal Correspondent; Co-Host, The View (2016–present)
 Rebecca Jarvis – Chief Business, Technology and Economics Correspondent (2013–present)
 Whit Johnson – Co-Anchor, Good Morning America: Weekend Edition; Anchor, World News Tonight Saturday (2018–present)
 Zachary Kiesch – Correspondent
 CeFaan Kim – Correspondent/ Correspondent, WABC-TV
 Phil Lipof – Correspondent (2021–present)
 Diane Macedo – Anchor, ABC News Live Update; Correspondent (2016–present)
 Rob Marciano – Weather Anchor, Good Morning America: Weekend Edition and World News Tonight; Senior Meteorologist (2014–present)
 David Muir – Anchor and Managing Editor, World News Tonight; Co-Anchor, 20/20 (2013–present)
 Janai Norman – Co-Anchor, Good Morning America: Weekend Edition; Correspondent (2011–present)
 Em Nguyen – Multi-Platform Reporter
 Eva Pilgrim – Co-Anchor, Good Morning America: Weekend Edition; Correspondent (2015–present)
 Byron Pitts – Co-Anchor, Nightline; Chief National Correspondent (2013–present)
 John Quiñones – Anchor, What Would You Do? (1982–present)
 Stephanie Ramos – Correspondent
 Will Reeve – Correspondent (2018–present)
 Erielle Reshef – Correspondent
 Deborah Roberts – 20/20 Contributing Anchor, Senior National Affairs Correspondent (1995–present)
 Robin Roberts – Co-Anchor, Good Morning America; Anchor, The Year (2002–present)
 Reena Roy – Multi-Platform Reporter
 Diane Sawyer – Anchor (1989–2014)
 Lara Spencer – Co-Anchor, Good Morning America (1999-2004; 2011–present)
 George Stephanopoulos – Co-Anchor, Good Morning America; Anchor, This Week (1999–present)
 Michael Strahan – Co-Anchor, Good Morning America (2014–present)
 Megan Tevrizian – Part-Time Correspondent
 Somara Theodore – Weather Anchor, Good Morning America: Weekend Edition and World News Tonight; Meteorologist (2023–present)
 Bob Woodruff – Military Correspondent
 Ginger Zee – Weather Anchor, Good Morning America and World News Tonight; Chief Meteorologist (2011–present)

Washington, D.C.

Faith Abubey – Multi-Platform Reporter
Mary Bruce – Senior White House Correspondent
John Donvan – Washington Correspondent (1982-1985; 1988–present)
Ike Ejiochi – Multi-Platform Reporter
Averi Harper – Deputy Political Director
Devin Dwyer - Senior Washington Reporter (2007–present)
Jonathan Karl – Chief Washington Correspondent; Co-Anchor, This Week (2003–present)
Rick Klein – Political Director
Terry Moran – Senior National Correspondent; Anchor, ABC News Live Update (1997–present)
Kenneth Moton – Correspondent
MaryAlice Parks – White House Correspondent
Kyra Phillips – Correspondent; Anchor, ABC News Live First
Alex Presha – Multi-Platform Reporter
Martha Raddatz – Co-Anchor, This Week; Chief Global Affairs Correspondent (1999–present)
Elizabeth Schulze – Multiplatform Reporter
Rachel Scott – Senior Congressional Correspondent (2016–present)
Karen Travers – White House Correspondent
Pierre Thomas – Chief Justice Correspondent
Jen Newman – Producer, ABC's Start Here

Atlanta

Elwyn Lopez – Corresponsdent
Steve Osunsami – Senior National Correspondent (1997–present)

Chicago

 Alex Perez – Correspondent

Dallas

Marcus Moore – Correspondent
Kevin Reece – Reporter for WFAA and Correspondent
Mireya Villarreal - Correspondent

Los Angeles

 Will Carr – Correspondent
 Matt Gutman – Chief National Correspondent (2008–present)
Morgan Norwood – Multiplatform Reporter
Zohreen Shah – Multiplatform Reporter
Kayna Whitworth – Los Angeles-based Correspondent (2015–present)
London

 Lama Hasan – Foreign Correspondent
 James Longman – Foreign Correspondent (2017–present)
 Julia Macfarlane – Multiplatform Reporter
 Ian Pannell – Senior Foreign Correspondent
 Maggie Rulli – Foreign Correspondent

Miami

 Victor Oquendo – Correspondent
Paris

 Ines de La Cuetara – Multi-platform Reporter

San Francisco

 Becky Worley – Consumer Correspondent; Technology Contributor (2005–present)
Current ABC News Radio personnel

 Michelle Franzen – Midday Anchor
Aaron Katersky – Correspondent
Brad Mielke – Correspondent, ABC News Radio; Host, Start Here podcast
Jason Nathanson – Entertainment Correspondent, ABC News Radio (2011–present)
Cheri Preston – New York-based Anchor/ Correspondent, ABC News Radio
Mark Remillard – New York-based Correspondent, ABC News Radio
Tom Rivers – London-based Foreign Correspondent, ABC News Radio
Jim Ryan – Dallas-based Correspondent, ABC News Radio
 Alex Stone – Los Angeles-based and Phoenix-based Correspondent, ABC News Radio (2004–present)

Contributors

 Darrell Blocker, the "Spy Whisperer" – Contributor (2019–present)
 Howard Bragman – Contributor (2010–present)
 Chris Christie – Contributor (2018–present)
 Nate Silver – Special Correspondent; Founder and Editor-in-Chief of FiveThirtyEight
 Dr. Darien Sutton – Medical Contributor (2020–present)

Former
('†' symbol indicates person deceased)

 Sharyn Alfonsi (2008–2012; now at CBS News)
 Christiane Amanpour (2010–2012; now at CNN)
 Jack Anderson (1975–1984)†
 Roone Arledge (1977–1998)†
 Thalia Assuras
 Ashleigh Banfield (1991–1993; now at NewsNation)
 Adrienne Bankert (now at NewsNation)
 Rona Barrett (1975–1980)
 Martin Bashir (2005–2010; later at MSNBC; now at BBC News)
 Willow Bay (1994–1998; later at CNN, MSNBC & NBC News; now Dean at USC Annenberg School for Communication and Journalism in Los Angeles)
 Steve Bell (1967–1986)†
 Jules Bergman (1953–1987)†
 John Berman (now at CNN) 
 Dr. Richard E. Besser (2009–2017)
 Bill Beutel (1962–1975)†
 Charles Bierbauer
 Erma Bombeck (1975–1986)†
 Abbie Boudreau
 Donna Brazile 
 David Brinkley (1981–1996)†
 David Brooks
 Aaron Brown (1992–2001; later at CNN)
 Hal Bruno (1978–1999)†
 Chris Bury (1982–2007)
 Andrea Canning (2004–2012; now at NBC News, correspondent for Dateline NBC)
 Marysol Castro (2004–2010; later at CBS News; then at ESPN; now PA announcer for New York Mets baseball at Citi Field)
 David Chalian (now at CNN)
 Sam Champion (2006–2013; later at The Weather Channel; now at WABC-TV in New York City)
 Rebecca Chase†
 Sylvia Chase†
 Leo Cherne†
 Julia Child†
 Liz Cho (now at WABC-TV in New York City)
 Spencer Christian (1986–1998; now at KGO-TV in San Francisco)
 Connie Chung (1998–2001; later at CNN; later at MSNBC)
 Ron Claiborne (1986–2018)
 Bob Clark†
 John Coleman†
 Ron Cochran†
 Pat Collins (later at WWOR-TV; now retired)
 Ann Compton (retired)
 Bertha Coombs
 Anderson Cooper (now at CNN)
 Nancy Cordes (now at CBS)
 Dan Cordtz (1974–1989)†
 Katie Couric (2011–2014)
 Catherine Crier
 Mort Crim (late 1960s–early 1970s) later at WDIV-TV in Detroit; retired from journalism
 Chris Cuomo (early 2000s–2009)
 Don Dahler (1999–2001) later at WCBS-TV in New York City; now at CBS News
 John Daly (1953–1960)†
 Morton Dean (1988–2002) retired
 Arnold Diaz (1995–2003) later at WCBS-TV and WNYW in New York City, now at WPIX in New York City
 Greg Dobbs
 Sam Donaldson (1967–2013) retired
 Linda Douglass
 Matthew Dowd
 Bill Downs (1963–1978)†
 Hugh Downs (1978–1999)†
 Nancy Dussault
 Stephanie Edwards
 Linda Ellerbee
 Josh Elliott (later at CBSN)
 Paula Faris
 Gillian Findlay
 Lisa Fletcher (now at WJLA-TV in Washington, D.C.)
 Jami Floyd (1998–2005) correspondent, co-anchor, Law and Justice Correspondent, Chief Consumer Correspondent
 Jack Ford (1999–2002; now at CBS News as chief legal analyst)
 Marshall Frady†
 Pauline Frederick†
 Ray Gandolf†
 Charles Gibson (1975–2009; now retired from journalism)
 Kendis Gibson (now at WFOR-TV in Miami)
 Richard Gizbert (now at Al Jazeera English)
 Don Goddard†
 Bianna Golodryga — later at Yahoo! News; now jointly on CBS News and CNN
 Jeff Greenfield
 Bill Greenwood†
 Roger Grimsby†
 David Hartman
 Dan Harris (2000-2021)
 Kaylee Hartung (now at NBC News)
 Sandy Hill
 Brandi Hitt (now at KABC-TV in Los Angeles)
 John Hockenberry (now host of the public-radio newscast The Takeaway)
 T. J. Holmes (2014–2023)
 Lisa Howard†
 Quincy Howe†
 Brit Hume (now at Fox News)
 Bob Jamieson
 Linzie Janis – correspondent (2013–2018)
 Tom Jarriel (retired)
 Peter Jennings (1964–2005)†
 Dr. Timothy Johnson
 Jackie Judd
 Larry Kane
 Herb Kaplow†
 Neal Karlinsky (now at Amazon)
 David Kerley
 Jim Kincaid†
 Dana King (retired)
 Christianne Klein
 Dan Kloeffler
 Jeffrey Kofman
 Ted Koppel (1966–2005) now at CBS News Sunday Morning
 Robert Krulwich (now at NPR, also co-host of Radiolab)
 Bill Lawrence†
 Elisabeth Leamy (now contributor for The Dr. Oz Show) 
 Mark Litke (1978-2008; now freelance)
 Tom Llamas (2014-2021; now at NBC News)
 Joan Lunden
 Lauren Lyster
 Catherine Mackin†
 John MacVane†
 Sheila MacVicar
 Miguel Marquez
 Michel Martin (now at NPR, weekend host of All Things Considered)
 Rachel Martin (now at NPR, co-host of Morning Edition)
 Terry McCarthy (journalist) (now CEO at the American Society of Cinematographers)
 Cynthia McFadden (now at NBC News)
 Lisa McRee (now in Los Angeles news)
 John McWethy†
 Antonio Mora
 Edward P. Morgan†
 Geoff Morrell
 Ben Mulroney
 Vinita Nair
 Heather Nauert (later Spokesperson for the United States Department of State during the Trump administration)
 Amna Nawaz (now with PBS NewsHour)
 Rob Nelson (now at NewsNation in Chicago)
 Kevin Newman (now at CTV News)
 Reena Ninan (now at CBS News)
 Michele Norris (now at NPR)
 Bill O'Reilly
 Ryan Owens
 Jesse Palmer
 Keke Palmer
 Tara Palmeri (now at Politico)
 Perri Peltz
 Tony Perkins (now at WUSA in Washington, D.C.)
 Indra Petersons (now at NBC)
 Stone Phillips
 Steven Portnoy
 Morgan Radford (now at NBC News)
 Vic Ratner
 Harry Reasoner†
 Dean Reynolds
 Frank Reynolds†
 Bill Ritter (now at WABC-TV in New York City)
 Geraldo Rivera (now at Fox News)
 Tanya Rivero (now at CBS News)
 Amy Robach (2012–2023)
 Cokie Roberts†
 Max Robinson (1978–1983; later at WMAQ-TV in Chicago)†
 Brian Rooney (1988-2011)
 Judd Rose†
 Brian Ross
 Louis Rukeyser†
 Pierre Salinger†
 Clayton Sandell 
 Marlene Sanders†
 Forrest Sawyer
 Dick Schaap†
 Jay Schadler
 John Scali†
 Mara Schiavocampo
 Nick Schifrin
 David Schoumacher
 John Schriffen
 Mike Schneider (now at NJTV)
 Jim Sciutto (now at CNN)
 Martin Seemungal (now at PBS)
 Barry Serafin
 Sunlen Serfaty (now at CNN)
 Lara Setrakian
 Bill Shadel†
 Bernard Shaw†
 Lynn Sherr
 Claire Shipman
 Lewis Shollenberger†
 Joel Siegel†
 Carole Simpson
 Howard K. Smith†
 Rachel Smith
 Kate Snow (now at NBC News)
 Dr. Nancy Snyderman
 Hari Sreenivasan
 Betsy Stark
 Alison Stewart
 Bill Stewart†
 John Stossel
 Kathleen Sullivan
 Stephanie Sy
 John Cameron Swayze†
 Jake Tapper (now at CNN)
 Richard Threlkeld†
 Jeffrey Toobin (now at CNN)
 Lem Tucker†
 Garrick Utley†
 Sander Vanocur†
 Elizabeth Vargas (1996–2018) (now at NewsNation)
 Cecilia Vega (2011–2023) (now​ at​ CBS​ News,​ Correspondent​ of​ ​60 minutes)
 Chris Wallace (now at CNN)
 Clarissa Ward (now at CNN)
 Barbara Walters†
 Bill Weir (now at CNN)
 David Wright
 John Yang (now correspondent; PBS NewsHour)
 Jessica Yellin
 Bob Young†
 Paula Zahn (now at Investigation Discovery)
 Jeff Zeleny (now at CNN)
 Dave Zinczenko (now nutrition and wellness editor at NBC's TODAY)

In Australia, Sky News Australia airs daily broadcasts of ABC World News Tonight (at 10:30 a.m.) and Nightline (at 1:30 a.m.) as well as weekly airings of 20/20 (on Wednesdays at 1:30 p.m., with an extended version at 2:00 p.m. on Sundays) and occasionally Primetime (at 1:30 p.m. on Thursdays, with extended edition at 2:00 p.m. on Saturdays). Coincidentally, that country's public broadcasting, the Australian Broadcasting Corporation, operates its own unrelated news division that is also named ABC News. The U.S. ABC News maintains a content sharing agreement with the Nine Network, which also broadcasts GMA domestically in the early morning before its own breakfast program.

In New Zealand, ABC World News was broadcast daily at 5:10 p.m. and again at 11:35 p.m. As with the BBC in the U.K., TVNZ 7 (owned by Television New Zealand) aired the program commercial-free, until the channel ceased operations on June 30, 2012.

References

External links

 
 "This Week" - Top Stories

 
American Broadcasting Company
Television news in the United States